The 2014 Bahamas Bowl was a post-season American college football bowl game that was played December 24, 2014 at Thomas Robinson Stadium in Nassau in the Bahamas. The first edition of the Bahamas Bowl featured the Central Michigan Chippewas of the Mid-American Conference against the Western Kentucky Hilltoppers of Conference USA. It began at 12:00 p.m. EST and aired on ESPN. It was one of the 2014–15 bowl games that concluded the 2014 FBS football season. Sponsored by the Popeyes Louisiana Kitchen fried chicken restaurant chain, the game was officially known as the Popeyes Bahamas Bowl.

Western Kentucky beat Central Michigan, 49–48.

By the middle of the third quarter, the Chippewas had fallen behind the Hilltoppers by a score of 49–14, but they scored four unanswered touchdowns and so near the end of the fourth quarter were down by only seven points.

With one second remaining on the clock, Central Michigan had the ball on their own 25 yard line. The would-be final play started with a 45-yard Hail Mary pass from QB Cooper Rush to receiver Jesse Kroll. As Kroll was being tackled he lateraled the ball to teammate Deon Butler, who darted 20 yards before lateraling to Courtney Williams. With no room to run, Williams executed a quick third lateral pass to star receiver Titus Davis who ran the final 13 yards and dove towards the pylon, scoring a touchdown that would have tied the game with a kicked extra point and sent the game into overtime, but instead Central Michigan attempted a two-point conversion for the win, which was unsuccessful. Had the try succeeded, it would have marked the largest comeback in bowl history and tied the largest comeback in any FBS game. The play was nominated for an ESPY Award.

Chippewas quarterback Cooper Rush threw seven touchdown passes, setting a new NCAA bowl game record.

This was the first postseason bowl game to be played outside the United States since the 2010 International Bowl at the Rogers Centre in Toronto, Canada.

Teams
The game featured the Central Michigan Chippewas of the Mid-American Conference against the Western Kentucky Hilltoppers of Conference USA.

This was a rematch of both teams' most recent bowl appearance. The 2012 Little Caesars Pizza Bowl saw Central Michigan defeat Western Kentucky by a score of 24–21.

Central Michigan Chippewas

After finishing the regular season with a 7–5 record, the Chippewas accepted their bid to the Bahamas Bowl.

Western Kentucky Hilltoppers

After finishing the regular season with a 7–5 record, the Hilltoppers accepted their bid to the Bahamas Bowl.

Weather and attendance
The game was played in brilliant sunshine, temperature of 79 degrees and a light, but steady, breeze from the SSE of 8 mph.
The announced attendance was 13,667, but USA Today reported that attendance at the 15,000-seat Thomas Robinson Stadium in downtown Nassau was considerably sparser. The lower sections of the stadium, in direct sunlight, were nearly deserted as the few hundreds of spectators clustered in the upper rows, in the shade. The small stands behind both end zones were closed off.

Game summary
This game saw WKU get off to a fast start, leading 42-14 at halftime. After building a 49-14 lead, CMU mounted a historic comeback scoring 34 unanswered points in the 4th quarter. CMU forced a 3 and out on WKU in the 4th quarter, which resulted in a punt that landed in the end zone.

Final play of the game
CMU found themselves down 49–42 with one second left on the clock at their own 25 yard line after a punt by the Hilltoppers. Cooper Rush threw a pass down field 48 yards, which was caught by Jesse Kroll. Kroll then lateraled the ball to Deon Butler for 10 yards, who was chased down from behind but managed to lateral it back to Courtney Williams. Williams ran forward 2 yards and threw the ball laterally to Titus Davis. Davis then ran to the sideline being chased by 4 WKU defenders and managed to dive into the corner of the end zone, hitting the pylon with the football. The play resulted in a touchdown for the Chippewas that pulled them within 1 point. However, their ensuing 2 point conversion failed as Rush's pass to the back of the end zone fell incomplete, resulting in a 49–48 WKU win.

Scoring summary

Source:

Statistics

See also
2006 Michigan State vs. Northwestern football game, the only time in FBS history that a team successfully rallied from a 35-point deficit
2006 Insight Bowl and 2016 Alamo Bowl (January), which share the record for the largest bowl comeback

References

External links
Box score at ESPN

Bahamas Bowl
Bahamas Bowl
Central Michigan Chippewas football bowl games
Western Kentucky Hilltoppers football bowl games
December 2014 sports events in North America
Bahamas Bowl